Joseph Cooper (born 27 December 1985) is a New Zealand professional racing cyclist, who last rode for UCI Continental team . He won the New Zealand National Road Race Championships in 2015 and 2017.

Major results

2005
 Oceania Under-23 Road Championships
5th Time trial
6th Road race
2007
 2nd  Time trial, Oceania Road Championships
2008
 5th Overall Tour of Southland
2009
 2nd Road race, National Road Championships
2010
 1st Stage 3 Tour of Southland
2012
 1st  Mountains classification New Zealand Cycle Classic
 10th Overall Tour de Langkawi
2013
 1st  Time trial, National Road Championships
 1st Stage 1 (ITT) New Zealand Cycle Classic
 3rd  Time trial, Oceania Road Championships
 3rd Overall Tour of Borneo
2014
 1st  Time trial, Oceania Road Championships
2015
 National Road Championships
1st  Road race
2nd Time trial
 1st Prologue New Zealand Cycle Classic
 3rd Overall Herald Sun Tour
2016
 2nd  Time trial, Oceania Road Championships
 3rd Time trial, National Road Championships
2017
 1st  Road race, National Road Championships
 1st  Overall New Zealand Cycle Classic
 1st Stage 9 Tour of Hainan
 2nd Overall Tour of China I
1st Stages 3 & 4 (ITT)
 5th Time trial, Oceania Road Championships
2018
 1st Stage 4 Tour de Korea
 1st  Mountains classification Rhône-Alpes Isère Tour

References

External links
 

1985 births
Living people
New Zealand male cyclists
Sportspeople from Wellington City